Tobias Goldschmidt (born 16 September 1981 in Haselünne) is a German politician of The Greens who has been serving as State Minister of Energy Transition, Climate Protection, Energy and Nature in the government of Schleswig-Holstein since 2022.

Career 
Goldschmidt was initially appointed State Secretary to the Schleswig-Holstein Ministry of Energy, Agriculture, the Environment and Digitalization under Minister Jan Phillipp Albrecht but later served under acting Minister Monika Heinold.

In the negotiations to form a so-called traffic light coalition of the Social Democratic Party (SPD), the Green Party and the Free Democratic Party (FDP) on the national level following the 2021 federal elections, Goldschmidt was part of his party's delegation in the working group on climate protection and energy policy, co-chaired by Matthias Miersch, Oliver Krischer and Lukas Köhler.

On 29 June 2022, Goldschmidt joined the Second Günther Cabinet as Schleswig-Holstein's State Minister of Energy Transition, Climate Protection, Environment and Nature. As one of his state's representatives at the Bundesrat, he serves on the Committee on the Environment, Nature Protection and Reactor Safety and the Committee on Economic Affairs.

Other activities
 Federal Network Agency for Electricity, Gas, Telecommunications, Post and Railway (BNetzA), Member of the Advisory Board (since 2022)

Personal life 
Goldschmidt is married and has three children.

References 

1981 births
Living people
German politicians
Schleswig-Holstein
Politicians from Lower Saxony
Alliance 90/The Greens politicians
Ministers of the Schleswig-Holstein State Government